The Rain Falls Where It Will is a 2020 Iranian - Canadian film directed, produced by Majid Barzegar, co-produced by Amir Endalah, co-screenplayed with Arman Khansarian. it stars Nazanin Ahmadi, Arshia Nikbin, Alireza Sanifar, Mazdak Mirabedini and Hamidreza Maleki. Nazanin Ahmadi awarded Crystal Simorgh for Best Actress at the 38th Fajr Film Festival.

Awards

References

External links 
 
 

2020 films
Films directed by Majid Barzegar
Iranian drama films
2020s Persian-language films